Pardis Parker is an award-winning director, writer, actor, and comedian. He's the creator and star of Comedy Central's Mideast Minute, the co-creator of Uncivil, a new sitcom in development at NBC, and the creator of Free, a new comedic drama in development at Amazon Prime.

His filmmaking work has screened at over 150 film festivals worldwide and received over 80 awards and nominations, his writing has been published by the New Yorker, the New York Times, the New York Review of Books, the Los Angeles Review of Books, the Chicago Sun-Times, Weekly Humorist, Lit Hub, and McSweeney's, he's appeared on TV and in films in the United States and Canada, and he's performed his stand-up comedy at comedy clubs, theaters, festivals, and TED.

TV & Digital
Parker is the creator or co-creator of three series for TV and streaming.

Mideast Minute
Created by and starring Parker, Mideast Minute is a satirical news show distributed worldwide on Comedy Central's digital platform.

The series satirizes U.S. propaganda efforts, particularly the Congress-funded Alhurra network, by trying to convince Middle Easterners that everything's OK in the Middle East.

In writing about the show, the Jerusalem Post said Parker had a "sharp, smart tone," Uproxx said Parker's "timing is impeccable," and Tubefilter said Parker was "both timely and funny — a combination that works."

Uncivil
Co-created by Parker, Uncivil is a single-cam comedy in development at NBC about a pair of friends – a prosecutor and public defender – who find that their personal squabbles spill into the courtroom and that their professional disputes follow them home.

Parker executive produces with Hazy Mills Productions' Sean Hayes and Todd Milliner, as well as with Bradley Gardner and co-creator Rell Battle. Universal Television is the studio.

Free
Created by Parker, Free is a half hour comedic drama in development at Amazon Prime.

Plan B Entertainment – led by partners Brad Pitt, Dede Gardner, and Jeremy Kleiner – is the production company.

Stand-up Comedy
A six-time Canadian Comedy Award nominee and a finalist for Canada's Next Top Comic and Bite TV's Stand Up and Bite Me, Parker won British star David Baddiel's international stand-up competition and previously became the first Canadian ever to book the CBS Comedy Showcase.

In reviews of his live show, the Kingston Herald said that "the skill with which Pardis Parker weaved the audience through his set was impressive," that Parker was "really relaxed on stage," and that "it felt as though you were just hanging out with a really funny friend," while Ottawa Life Magazine said that "his self-deprecating manner and friendly stage presence make him highly likeable." The Daily Star listed Parker as one of their "Stand-up Comedians That Need Your Attention," and said they "highly recommend" his act. Vulture, in selecting his stand-up clips as one of their "Best Comedy Videos of the Month" in March 2021 and December 2021, said that "it's amazing to see a funny comedian become a great comedian," and that Parker's "a performer who's found his comfort zone."

Parker has had multiple stand-up comedy performances broadcast on TV, radio, and the web, and he's a frequent performer at the Hollywood Improv, Hollywood Laugh Factory, and World Famous Comedy Store.

TED Talks

Parker performed at the global TED Conference in Monterey, California, in August 2021. His TED Talk, "I'm Tired of People Telling Me to Grind", was released in January 2022. Moda Magazine listed it as one of their "Seven TED Talks to Get You Through the Day," and said Parker's performance was both "relatable" and "hilarious."

Parker performed for a second time at the global TED Conference in Vancouver, Canada, in April 2022. His second TED Talk, "I'm Terrified of Wanting to be a Billionaire", was released in October 2022. In reviews of the conference, Mats Lederhausen said Parker's performance was "truly funny," and Chris Duffy said Parker's set was "incredible."

Acting
Parker has received multiple Best Actor nominations for his work in The Dance and Afghan, and has appeared on television and in film on both sides of the border, including Life in Pieces on CBS, Combat Hospital on ABC, Little Mosque on the Prairie on CBC, Single White Spenny and Moderation Town on Showcase, Really Me on The Family Channel, and indie drama Snow.

His acting work has received acclaim from the National Screen Institute of Canada, which remarked that his "timing and body language in The Dance was exceptional," from Indiewire, which complimented his "light comedic touch," and from Radio Canada, which said that "he's a kind of Seth MacFarlane, someone extremely multi-talented who can write, direct, and act, and who's very convincing in his roles."

Writing

Parker's writing and cartoons have been published by The New Yorker, The New York Times, The New York Review of Books, The Los Angeles Review of Books, the Chicago Sun-Times, Weekly Humorist, Literary Hub, and McSweeney's.

Bibliography

Filmmaking
Parker's films and music videos, including The Dance, Afghan, and Two Men, Two Cows, Two Guns, have screened at over 150 film festivals worldwide and received over 80 awards and nominations.

The Playlist called him an "up and coming talent on the Canadian film scene," Film School Rejects said his work was "riotously funny, with a narrative flair that makes one hope he has a feature coming soon," and CinemaSinema lauded his ability to "squeeze more heart from an 11 minute short film than many Hollywood directors can muster from feature length pictures."

Filmography

Accolades

References

External links

News articles and interviews

Little, Simon. "TED Talks return to Vancouver, will feature Elon Musk, Bill Gates, Al Gore and Finnish PM Sanna Marin". Global News, March 4, 2022.
Kelly-Clyne, Luke & Techler, Graham. "Joe Rogan Chats With the Grinch, and This Month’s Other Must-See Comedy Shorts". Vulture, December 30, 2021.
Donovan, Dan. "Pardis Parker — a modern-day court jester". Ottawa Life Magazine, December 13, 2021.
Goldsmith, Jill. "Netflix CMO Bozoma Saint John, Lizzo To Topline Global TED Conference In Monterey". Deadline Hollywood, June 21, 2021.
Kelly-Clyne, Luke & Techler, Graham. "Chet Hanks, Tampons for Men, and This Month’s Other Must-See Comedy Shorts". Vulture, March 31, 2021.
Ross, Shane. "How buying illegal milk on P.E.I. helped author discover cultural revelation". CBC, November 24, 2020.
Andreeva, Nellie & Petski, Denise. "‘Uncivil’ Comedy From Rell Battle, Pardis Parker & Hazy Mills In Works At NBC". Deadline Hollywood, November 2, 2020.
Saleh, Rabita. "Stand-up Comedians That Need Your Attention". The Daily Star, September 6, 2018.
McClennan, Sophia. "Trump can’t ban Muslim comics: Hasan Minhaj understands the 1st Amendment better than Trump". Salon, May 7, 2017.
Horton, H. Perry. "'Two Men, Two Cows, Two Guns' is an Equation for a Darkly Farcical Film". Film School Rejects, April 7, 2017.
Daniel, Smriti. "Q&A: Satirist Pardis Parker takes aim at US propaganda". Al Jazeera, March 20, 2017.
Newbould, Chris. "Comedy Central’s MidEast Minute released online". The National, March 19, 2017.
Daniel, Smriti. "‘Mideast Minute’ with Lankan born Pardis Parker". The Sunday Times, March 5, 2017.
Wheeler, Brad. "Mideast Minute: Pardis Parker lampoons U.S. propaganda efforts in Middle East". The Globe and Mail, February 22, 2017.
Spiro, Amy. "Spending a ‘Mideast Minute’ with Pardis Parker". The Jerusalem Post, February 18, 2017.
McClennan, Sophia. "Hitting Trump where it hurts: The satire troops take up comedy arms against Donald Trump". Salon, February 11, 2017.
Brown, Hannah. "Screen savors: A lighter approach". The Jerusalem Post, February 10, 2017.
Hamedy, Saba. "Comedy Central digital series 'Mideast Minute' just got way more timely". Mashable, February 3, 2017.
Gutelle, Sam. "Comedy Central’s Latest Web Series Satirizes U.S.-Run News Networks In The Middle East". Tubefilter, January 31, 2017.
Easter, Makeda. "Pardis Parker on new Comedy Central Web series: 'It's going to be a fun few years'". LA Times, January 30, 2017.
Dickens, Donna. "Comedy Central’s New ‘Mideast Minute’ Suggests Immigrating To The U.S. Is Overrated". Uproxx, January 27, 2017.
Nihal, Mariam. "Shows To Watch Out For in 2017". Saudi Gazette, January 21, 2017.
Upadhyaya, Kayla Kumari. "Comedy Central green-lights satirical news program focused on Middle East". AV Club, November 4, 2016.
Lincoln, Ross. "News Satire Series ‘Mideast Minute’ Coming To Comedy Central Digital". Deadline Hollywood, November 3, 2016.
Huang, Terry. "The Black List Interview: Pardis Parker". The Black List blog, July 1, 2016.
Cooke, Stephen. "Too Much Music This Holiday". The Chronicle Herald, June 28, 2012.
Nemetz, Andrea. "Picnicface eating up the industry recognition". The Chronicle Herald, June 9, 2012.
Eng, David. "2012 Canadian Comedy Awards - nominations". Chino Kino, June 8, 2012.
Staff. "Canadian Comedy Awards Nominees". Throng, June 8, 2012.
Staff. "Nominees" . Canadian Comedy Awards & Festival, June 7, 2012.
Staff. "Canadian Comedy Awards | Nominees". The Comedy Network, June 7, 2012.
McCarthy, Sean. "Nominees for the 2012 Canadian Comedy Awards". The Comic's Comic, June 7, 2012.
Staff. "Canadian Comedy Awards 2012 - nominees announced!". The Comedy Killers, June 7, 2012.
May, Geoff. "Nominees Announced For The Canadian Comedy Awards". Bite.ca, June 7, 2012.
Johnson, Sharilyn. "2012 Canadian Comedy Awards Nominees". Third Beat Magazine, June 7, 2012.
MacD, Rob. "Rob's 7-Word Reviews of some IMAF Short Films". The Annekenstein Monster, May 15, 2012.
Lapena, Cindy. "The Island Media Arts Festival Opening Night Screening". ONRPEI.ca, May 9, 2012.
Ross. "5 Great short films you can watch in the next hour". Matinee, May 9, 2012.
Bondo. "Best of the 2012 Indie Spirit Film Festival". Movie Review Warehouse, April 22, 2012.
McFarlan, Emily. "Judson film fest steps onto national stage". The Elgin Courier-News, April 5, 2012.
Pacheco, Yeray. "7ª Jornada del Festival Internacional de Cine de Las Palmas de Gran Canaria". Las Horas Perdidas, March 23, 2012.
Paul, Natalya. "Flatpack Festival presents: Salon des Refusés". UoBlogfest, March 22, 2012.
Stewart, Jeanette. "Canadian movie examines impact of disaster". Saskatoon StarPhoenix, March 16, 2012.
Yates, Travis. "YP Quincy's Big Dam Film Festival". The Local Q, February 23, 2012.
Hart, Rodney. "Big Dam Film Festival gets right to the point with short films". Quincy Herald-Whig, February 17, 2012.
Mendoza, Tony. "Episode 11: Pardis Parker". Short Cuts Podcast, November 17, 2011.
Trenholm, Michael. "Pardis Parker - A Rising Star from the Halifax Indie Film Scene". East Coast Kitchen Party, November 3, 2011.
Knox, Carsten. "Best Halifax Ambassador". The Coast, November 2, 2011.
Ede, Joel. "Pardis Parker's 'The Dance' is a Short Film with Wide Appeal". Monterey County Weekly, October 14, 2011.
Knox, Carsten. "Diversity Film Festival to happen this week". The Coast, October 5, 2011.
Jeff. "Featured Nova Scotian - Pardis Parker". Nova Scotia | Come to Life, October 4, 2011.
Devereaux, Allison. "Trail's End". CBC Radio, October 1, 2011.
Bailey, Katie. "Who Loves the Sun named best feature at Film North". Playback, September 29, 2011.
Sam. "SNOB Film Festival Reviews by Sam" . Green Carbon, September 27, 2011.
Nemetz, Andrea. "Melski lands quad at film fest". The Chronicle Herald, September 25, 2011.
CTV Atlantic. "Halifax film scores big with audiences, film critics". CTV News, September 23, 2011.
Oostveen, Lauren. "AFF Day 3 and 4". Zombies Ate Lauren, September 19, 2011.
Nemetz, Andrea. "Filmmaker Parker ready to Dance at film fest Sunday". The Chronicle Herald, September 17, 2011.
Knox, Carsten. "Film Fest Reviews | Atlantic Film Festival". The Coast, September 15, 2011.
Knox, Carsten. "The deal with Picnicface". The Coast, September 15, 2011.
Chronicle Herald Staff. "N.S. takes centre stage at TIFF". The Chronicle Herald, August 11, 2011.
Knox, Carsten. "TIFF to highlight Nova Scotia talent". The Coast, August 4, 2011.
Ravindran, Manori. "Celebrate Canada Day with Colin Mochrie and some biting stand-up". National Post, July 1, 2011.
Chronicle Herald Staff. "Halifax's Pardis Parker makes standup comedy finals". The Chronicle Herald, June 16, 2011.
Johns, Stephanie. "Pardis Parker makes finals of Stand Up & Bite Me". The Coast, June 13, 2011.
May, Geoff. "Pardis Parker Is Judges Choice For Stand Up & Bite Me Round 3". Bite.ca, June 10, 2011.
Baru, Max. "Lakeshorts Passports". Humber Happenings, Summer 2011.
Hardin, Char. "Two Men, Two Cows, Two Guns (2009) Short Film Review". Horrorphilia, June 6, 2011.
Knox, Carsten. "Two Men, Two Cows, Two Guns now online". The Coast, May 31, 2011.
Knox, Carsten. "Pardis Parker's busy life". The Coast, May 5, 2011.
Nemetz, Andrea. "Multi-talented filmmaker readying his next short". The Chronicle Herald, April 30, 2011.
Knox, Carsten. "Hey Rosetta!'s The Year You Were Born video gets into NSI Online Short Film Fest". The Coast, April 19, 2011.
Clarke, Gerard. "Tallahassee Film Festival – Friday". CinemaSinema, April 9, 2011.
Misch, Christopher. "Review: Snow *ReelWorld Screening*". Next Projection, April 7, 2011.
Lidstone, Dave. "Pardis Parker scores again with Afghan and Two Men, Two Cows, Two Guns". The Coast, April 6, 2011.
Gallaudet, Bruce. "Davis Film Festival features another side of Speck". The Davis Enterprise, April 4, 2011.
McFarlan, Emily. "Oscar nominee is tops locally". The Courier-News, April 4, 2011.
Harvey, Dennis. "Film Reviews – Snow". Variety, March 28, 2011.
Flinn, Sue Carter. "Jackson, Bankson, Parker nab nods". The Coast, March 18, 2011.
McGuire, Jacob. "An interview with Pardis Parker". The Local Q, March 9, 2011.
Ville Voice Staff. "2011 Derby City Film Fest Nominees Named" . The Ville Voice, January 5, 2011.
Budreau, Chuck. "Finalists and Acting Nominations for the 2011 Derby City Film Festival Announced". Indy Film News, January 4, 2011.
Chronicle Herald Staff. "2010 – The Honour Roll". The Chronicle Herald, December 26, 2010.
Andrews, Chas. "Selections Made for Derby City Film Festival" . Louisville.com, December 20, 2010.
The Amplifier. "The Derby City Film Festival Announces Selections For The 2011 Festival held in February". Bowling Green Daily News, December 20, 2010.
Vimooz Staff. "2011 Derby City Film Festival Announces Selections". Vimooz, December 15, 2010.
Semansky, Matt. "Town without TV". The Coast, December 9, 2010.
Shore, Matt. "Interview: Comedian Pardis Parker". The Unstoppable Colossus, December 3, 2010.
Chronicle Herald Staff. "Volunteers, innovators get GO awards". The Chronicle Herald, November 8, 2010.
Adams, Trevor J. "Ready, set, go". Halifax Magazine, November 8, 2010.
Elayadathusseril, Gloria. "Top Comic". Canadian Immigrant Magazine, November 1, 2010.
Chronicle Herald Staff. "Halifax film named festival semi-finalist". The Chronicle Herald, September 9, 2010.
Chronicle Herald Staff. "Halifax comedian finalist for Canada's Next Top Comic". The Chronicle Herald, August 17, 2010.
Yahoo! Canada News. "Haligonian could be Next Top Comic". Yahoo! Canada News, August 17, 2010.
Metro News. "Haligonian could be Next Top Comic". Metro News, August 17, 2010.
Flinn, Sue Carter. "Pardis Parker on Implants and awards". The Coast, August 2, 2010.
Medley, Mark. "Canadian short film wins big at festival". National Post, July 27, 2010.
Nemetz, Andrea. "Halifax film wins awards at U.S. fest". The Chronicle Herald, July 27, 2010.
MSN News. "Halifax film earns 3 awards at U.S. fest". MSN News, July 26, 2010.
CBC News. "Halifax film earns 3 awards at U.S. fest". CBC News, July 26, 2010.
Sympatico.ca News. "Halifax film earns 3 awards at U.S. fest". Sympatico.ca News, July 26, 2010.
Yahoo! Canada News. "Local film gets 3 nods at film fest". Yahoo! Canada News, July 26, 2010.
Haligonia.ca. "Local film gets 3 nods at film fest". Haligonia.ca, July 26, 2010.
Metro News. "Local film gets 3 nods at film fest". Metro News, July 26, 2010.
Midtown Montgomery Living. "Montgomery Film Festival". Midtown Montgomery Living, July 26, 2010.
A Heart in New York. "Review: Montgomery Film Festival 2: This time its personal.". A Heart in New York, July 25, 2010.
Springhill Record. "Making Music". Springhill Record, July 15, 2010.
Faces Magazine. "Pardis Parker (PDF)". Faces Magazine, July 2010.
CBC Radio. "The Debaters – Rural Immigration". CBC Radio, June 26, 2010.
Nemetz, Andrea. "Parker up for four comedy awards". The Chronicle Herald, June 23, 2010.
CBC.ca. "Less Than Kind leads comedy nominees". CBC.ca, June 22, 2010.
The Comedy Network. "2010 Canadian Comedy Awards Nominees Announced". www.thecomedynetwork.ca, June 22, 2010.
Canadian Comedy Awards. "Nominees". www.canadiancomedy.ca, June 22, 2010.
Flinn, Sue Carter. "Pardis Parker's Afghan scores another award". The Coast, June 17, 2010.
The Tattler. "Parker film Two Men, Two Cows, Two Guns is No. 2". The Chronicle Herald, June 3, 2010.
Lang, Alison. "Pardis Parker fights real pain with really good comedy". The Coast, April 22, 2010.
Cooke, Stephen. "Laughing matters". The Chronicle Herald, April 21, 2010.
Vooght, Clare. "The Infidel: How to tell a religious joke?". The Comedy Digest, April 12, 2010.
Cavendish, Dominic. "Which religion is funniest? Movie's online contest pokes fun at them all". The Ottawa Citizen, April 9, 2010.
The Tattler. "Comedian Parker performs at London film premiere". The Chronicle Herald, April 8, 2010.
Cavendish, Dominic. "Which is the funniest religion? Omid Djalili and David Baddiel talk to Dominic Cavendish about their daring new comedy 'The Infidel'.". The Daily Telegraph, April 5, 2010.
Adams, Trevor J. "Wise guys: The hottest names in Canadian comedy take the stage at the Halifax Comedy Fest". Where | Halifax, April, 2010.
Bernard, Chantal. "Warm Up with Laughter this Winter with the Ha!ifax Comedy Fest on CBC Television Beginning Jan. 12 at 9:30 p.m.". CBC.ca, January 6, 2010.
Massarella, Linda. "Next in line – Pardis Parker is poised to join the ranks of Canadinan comics who made it big south of the border" . The London Free Press, January 4, 2010.
Massarella, Linda. "Next in line – Pardis Parker is poised to join the ranks of Canadinan comics who made it big south of the border". The Sudbury Star, January 4, 2010.
Massarella, Linda. "Next in line – Pardis Parker is poised to join the ranks of Canadian comics who made it big south of the border". The Kingston Whig Standard, January 2, 2010.
Massarella, Linda. "Haligonian chooses comedy over health food". The Toronto Sun, December 29, 2009.
Massarella, Linda. "Haligonian chooses comedy over health food". The Ottawa Sun, December 29, 2009.
Massarella, Linda. "Haligonian chooses comedy over health food". The Winnipeg Sun, December 29, 2009.
Massarella, Linda. "Haligonian chooses comedy over health food". The Calgary Sun, December 29, 2009.
Massarella, Linda. "Haligonian chooses comedy over health food". The Edmonton Sun, December 29, 2009.
Massarella, Linda. "Haligonian chooses comedy over health food". 24 Hours Vancouver, December 29, 2009.
Flinn, Sue Carter. "It's Pardis Parker time! Halifax filmmaker/actor first Canadian to be selected for CBS showcase.". The Coast, December 16, 2009.
Flinn, Sue Carter. "Halifax comedy on the laugh track". The Coast, December 16, 2009.
The Tattler. "N.S. comedian wins spot in CBS showcase". The Chronicle Herald, December 3, 2009.
McLeod, Paul. "Local funnyman first Canadian picked for CBS showcase". Metro News, December 2, 2009.
Flinn, Sue Carter. "CBC TV's Short Film Face-off follies – Local filmmakers compete for CBC production deal". The Coast, June 16, 2009.
Conway, Michael. "ViewFinders: International Film Festival for Youth" . Southender Magazine, April, 2009.
Kay, Michelle. "Humour versus hatred: Sri Lankan immigrant creates films that express different cultural experiences". Canadian Immigrant, September, 2008.
MacGregor, Phlis. "Afghan... a short film with an innovative approach to deal with racist graffiti". CBC Radio | In the Arts, September 15, 2008.
Fleet, Josh. "Dwell on them for too long, and these punch lines will hurt". ''The SHPiEL Vol. 5, Issue 8 – Printed April 15, 2008.

Living people
Year of birth missing (living people)
Canadian stand-up comedians
Canadian male film actors
Canadian Bahá'ís
Canadian people of Sri Lankan descent
Canadian people of Iranian descent
21st-century Bahá'ís
20th-century Bahá'ís
Actors from Kandy